Kyle Kentish is a Grand Prix motorcycle racer from the United Kingdom.

Career statistics

By season

Races by year
(key)

References

http://www.motogp.com/en/riders/Kyle+Kentish

Scottish motorcycle racers
1985 births
Living people
125cc World Championship riders